Admiral Cooper may refer to:

Charles Cooper II (born 1967), U.S. Navy vice admiral
George H. Cooper (1821–1891), U.S. Navy rear admiral
Philip H. Cooper (1844–1912), U.S. Navy rear admiral